The Oquirrh Mountain Utah Temple  is a temple of the Church of Jesus Christ of Latter-day Saints located in South Jordan, Utah, a suburb of Salt Lake City. South Jordan was the first city in the world to have two temples (it also has the Jordan River Temple). The temple was the fourth in the Salt Lake Valley and the 13th in the state of Utah.

The Oquirrh Mountain Utah Temple serves approximately 83,000 Latter-day Saints living in the western Salt Lake Valley. The building is faced with light beige granite quarried and milled in China.

History
The Oquirrh Mountain Utah Temple was built on a bluff on the edge of the Daybreak Community; the property was donated to the church by Kennecott Land, a portion of a company that mines copper and precious minerals from the Oquirrh Mountains, just a few miles west of the temple. Ground was broken for construction on December 16, 2006. At the groundbreaking it was announced the structure would be named the "Oquirrh Mountain Utah Temple"; it had previously been known as the "South Jordan Utah Temple".

On June 13, 2009, the spire was struck by lightning during a thunderstorm. The statue of the Angel Moroni was tarnished, and was replaced on August 11, 2009.

Prior to dedicatory services that took place on August 21 to 23, 2009, the public was invited to tour the new temple during an open house from June 1, 2009, to August 1, 2009.

In 2020, like all the church's other temples, the Oquirrh Mountain Utah Temple was closed in response to the coronavirus pandemic.

See also

 The Church of Jesus Christ of Latter-day Saints in Utah
 Comparison of temples of The Church of Jesus Christ of Latter-day Saints
 List of temples of The Church of Jesus Christ of Latter-day Saints
 List of temples of The Church of Jesus Christ of Latter-day Saints by geographic region
 Temple architecture (Latter-day Saints)

References

Additional reading

External links
 
 Oquirrh Mountain Utah Temple Official site
 Oquirrh Mountain Utah Temple at ChurchofJesusChristTemples.org

2009 establishments in Utah
21st-century Latter Day Saint temples
Buildings and structures in South Jordan, Utah
Religious buildings and structures completed in 2009
Religious buildings and structures in Salt Lake County, Utah
Temples (LDS Church) in Utah